The national symbols of Albania are symbols that are used in Albania to represent what is unique about the nation, reflecting different aspects of its culture and history. The symbols may also be used in the Kosovo, Macedonia, Montenegro, Greece (Chameria), Serbia (Preševo Valley) and by the Arbëreshë in Italy.

Official symbols

Unofficial symbols

See also 
 Albanian culture & Albanian people
 List of World Heritage Sites in Albania

References 

 
Albanian culture